The Olympus Rally is an event in the motorsport of rallying.  While it has usually been run as a national rally, in 1986–1988, it was a round in the FIA World Rally Championship, the most recent time a WRC rally has been run in the United States and the last in North America until Rally Mexico in 2004.

TSD Rally 
The first Olympus Rally was held as a Time Speed Distance rally in 1968. It continued as a TSD rally until 1973 when SCCA started the SCCA Pro Rally Championship with the Olympus Rally as its second event.

World Rally Championship 
After being observed by the FIA for WRC status in 1985, from 1986–1988, the Olympus was a round of the World Rally Championship.  From 1985–1987, the rally was sponsored by Toyota.

The 1985 Olympus “World Championship Prototype” event was won by Hannu Mikkola and Arne Hertz in a Group B Audi Quattro S1.

Markku Alen emerged on top of the results as the 1986 Olympus first gained full World Championship status, taking a Lancia Delta S4 and co-driver Ilkka Kivimäki to victory.

In 1987, the Olympus was attended by a number of top international teams, including Nissan, Toyota, and Suzuki. Juha Kankkunen won overall, as his and other Lancia Delta HF 4WD’s dominated the podium.

Massimo “Miki” Biasion won the fourth and final Olympus World Championship Rally in 1988 – his fourth of the season for Lancia, on his way to being the first Italian FIA World Rally Champion.

Winners

National Rally 
The Olympus Rally was first held as a stage rally in 1973.  It was headquartered in Shelton, WA and was part of the SCCA Pro Rally Championship.  It continued to be part of that championship through 1975.  In 1976, it became part of the NARA (North American Rally Association) championship (which later changed its name to NARRA (North American Rally Racing Association)).  It was part of that championship through 1979.  In 1980, it switched back to the SCCA ProRally Championship and remained in that championship through 1987.

While the name was used for a regional rally supporting the 2001 Wild West SCCA Pro Rally, the Olympus Rally was not held from 1989 through 2005.

The Olympus Rally returned as national rally in 2006 and was part of the United States Rally Championship.  In 2007, it switched to the Rally America National Championship and was part of that championship through 2012.  After a dispute with Rally America, the rally was cancelled in 2013.  It was originally scheduled to return as a NASA Rally Sport National qualifier round in 2014, however the issues with Rally America were resolved and the rally ran as a Rally America regional that year.  In 2015, it returned to the Rally America National Championship. In 2017 it became sanctioned by the American Rally Association and has been a round in the ARA National Championship since then.

Winners

External links 
Olympus Rally
WRC Olympus Rally pictures from prorallypix.com

Rally competitions in the United States
Sports in Olympia, Washington
Motorsport in Washington (state)
Rally America
Recurring sporting events established in 1973
World Rally Championship rallies